Mordellistena algeriensis is a species of beetle in the genus Mordellistena of the family Mordellidae. It was discovered in 1966.

References

algeriensis
Beetles described in 1966